The Hartford Hawks men's lacrosse team represents the University of Hartford in  National Collegiate Athletic Association (NCAA) Division I men's lacrosse. Hartford currently competes as an Independent  and plays its home games at Al-Marzook Field at Alumni Stadium in West Hartford, Connecticut.

Prior to joining the America East Conference it had been a member of the Northeast Conference (NEC).

History

1973–1992
Hartford men's lacrosse was established as a club sport in 1973 until it became a varsity program in 1979.

In 1985, Hartford hired John Herbert as head coach for the team's inaugural season in Division 1. Hartford competed as an independent until joining the Northeast Conference in 1993. As an independent team, Hartford had an overall record of 36–58.

1993–2003
In 1993, first-year head coach Jack McGetrick replaced Rob Quinn and led the team to its first winning season in eight years. In 1997, the Hartford Hawks joined the America East Conference. In 2000, the Hawks completed a 14–2 record and earned the NEC regular season title after completing a 4–1 conference record. In 2003, McGetrick once again led the Hawks to a regular season title after finishing the season with a 9–8 record and a 4–1 conference record. After 11 seasons with the Hawks, McGetrick stepped down from his head coaching duties finishing as the winningest lacrosse coach in the programs history.
BlackJack returned in 2004 to coach his alumni to victory one last time over the current squad. A feat never accomplished and most likely never repeated. The game was played on the muddy practice field behind the 5’s so the lacrosse team didn’t ruin the field used by the university’s crown jewel soccer team.

2004–2005
Andy Towers replaced McGetrick as head coach for the 2004 season and led the Hawks to an unsuccessful 0–14 record. The following season, now under the helm of Bill Warder, ended in a disappointing 2–12 record.

2006–2016
In 2006, Peter Lawrence became head coach of the Hawks. In 2011, coming off seven straight losing seasons; the Hawks, led by Lawrence, would win their first conference tournament. Hartford also made their first NCAA tournament appearance in 2011 but lost in the first round to the second-seeded Cornell, 12–5. In 2016, the Hawks lost 14–9 against Quinnipiac in a play-in game in the 2016 NCAA tournament. Following the 2016 season, Peter Lawrence resigned as head coach of Hartford after 11 seasons.

2017–present
After the departure of long time head coach Peter Lawrence; Hartford promoted assistant coach Ryan Martin to head coach. In his first season as head coach, Martin led the Hawks to a 6–8 overall record.

Division III
On May 6, 2021, the University of Hartford Board of Regents voted to drop its athletic department to Division III. The drop is set to take place no later than September 1, 2025.

Annual record
{| class="wikitable"

|- align="center"

|-style="background: #ffffdd;"
| colspan="8" align="center" | Division I

†NCAA canceled 2020 collegiate activities due to the COVID-19 virus.

References

External links
 Official website
LAXPOWER Hartford Hawks
Hartford Hawks Record Book

 
Hartford Hawks